was a Japanese daimyō of the early Edo period. He was the son of Tokugawa Ieyasu's daughter Kamehime with her husband, Okudaira Nobumasa. Due to this family connection, he was allowed to use the Matsudaira surname. He was briefly adopted by Suganuma Sadatoshi; however, this adoption lasted for only five years. Upon Nobumasa's death, Tadamasa succeeded him as lord of the Kanō Domain.

References
 "Kanō-han" on Edo 300 HTML (22 February 2008)

|-

1580 births
1614 deaths
Daimyo
Okudaira clan
Okudaira-Matsudaira clan